Clair W. Roddewig (April 18, 1903 – February 24, 1975) was an American attorney and the 14th Attorney General of South Dakota.

Early life and education
Roddewig grew up in Newcastle, Nebraska.

He received his L.L.B. from the Creighton University School of Law.

Legal career
A native of Newcastle, Nebraska, Roddewig studied law at Creighton University in Omaha and was admitted to the Nebraska bar in 1926. Moving from Omaha to South Dakota in 1931, he became the state's Assistant Attorney General in 1933 and served as Attorney General of South Dakota from 1937 to 1939 as a Democrat. In 1938, he was defeated for reelection by Republican Leo A. Temmey, who defeated him by 7.6 points.

He became a lawyer for the Interstate Commerce Commission in 1939 and was general counsel of the Office of Defense Transportation from 1942 to 1945.

Following World War II, Rodewig moved to Chicago, working as general counsel of the Chicago and Eastern Illinois Railroad. In 1947, he became vice president of the railroad. He became the railroad's president in 1949, serving in this role until 1957. From 1957 through 1970, he served as president of the Association of Western Railways.

Active in Chicago civics, he was considered an ally of Mayor Richard J. Daley. Roddewig served as president of the Chicago Board of Education from 1962 through 1964.

Later career
Roddewig later served on the Citizens Board of the University of Chicago and the advisory committee of the Illinois Board of Higher Education.

He had served on the board of Catholic Charities of Chicago and was a trustee of John Marshall Law School, which gave him a J.D. degree in 1947, of DePaul University, which gave him an honorary L.L. D. in 1963, and of St. Mary's College in Notre Dame, Ill.

At the time of his death, he was a member of the Chicago Transit Authority Board.

Roddewig died on February 24, 1975, at the age of 72. He died at the residence of one of his daughters in the Chicago suburb of Hinsdale, Illinois.

References

1903 births
1975 deaths
South Dakota Attorneys General
South Dakota Democrats
Creighton University School of Law alumni
People from Dixon County, Nebraska
20th-century American lawyers
Nebraska lawyers
Presidents of the Chicago Board of Education